SS Jebba was a steam ship that ran aground near Bolt Tail, off the coast of Devon, England in 1907. Built by Sir Raylton Dixon & Company, Middlesbrough, she was launched in 1896 as the SS Albertville for the Cie. Belge-Maritime du Congo, Antwerp. They sold her in 1898 to Elder Dempster & Co, Liverpool, who renamed her Jebba.

On 18 March 1907 she ran aground near Bolt Tail, while inbound from West Africa for Plymouth and Liverpool with a cargo of ivory, rubber, palm oil, pineapples, bananas and the mail from Nigeria and the Gold Coast. Her 76 crew and 79 passengers were taken off by bosun's chair, with the two fishermen who had organised the rescue, Isaac Jarvis and John Argeat, being awarded the Albert Medal for Lifesaving. The cargo was salvaged after her loss, with the mail she was carrying later the subject of philatelic study. Some salvage of valuable materials and components from the wreck was carried out, but most of the ship was gradually broken up by the waves, and now there are only traces of the ship on the seabed.

By coincidence, another larger liner, SS Suevic of the White Star Line, had also run aground earlier the same night along the same coastline, almost within sight of Jebba, its crew and passengers also requiring rescue. Unlike Jebba, the Suevic was salvaged.

References

External links 

1896 ships
Maritime incidents in 1907
Philately of Nigeria
Merchant ships of Belgium
Merchant ships of the United Kingdom
Ships built on the River Tees
Shipwrecks in the English Channel